The 1910 Sewanee Tigers football team represented Sewanee: The University of the South during the 1910 college football season.

Schedule

Players

Varsity lettermen

Line

Backfield

Subs

References

Sewanee
Sewanee Tigers football seasons
Sewanee Tigers football